Stay may refer to:

Places
 Stay, Kentucky, an unincorporated community in the US

Law
 Stay of execution, a ruling to temporarily suspend the enforcement of a court judgment
 Stay of proceedings, a ruling halting further legal process in a trial

Structures and mechanics
 Stay, in a cable-stayed bridge
 Stay, bone (corsetry), one of the rigid parts of a corset
 Stays, or corset, a garment worn to mold and shape the torso; See History of corsets
 Stays (nautical), heavy ropes, wires, or rods that connect the masts of a sailing vessel to the hull
 Boiler stay, an internal structural element of a boiler
 Chain stay and seat stay, parts of a bicycle frame
 Collar stay, a small rigid piece used to maintain the point of a shirt collar
 Guy-wire, or stay, a metal cable used to support a tall structure, such as a radio mast
 Stay cable, used to hold up a weight

Arts, entertainment, and media

Films
 Stay (2005 film), a 2005 psychological thriller directed by Marc Forster
 Stay (2006 film), also known as Sleeping Dogs Lie, a 2006 romantic comedy directed by Bobcat Goldthwait
 Stay (2013 film), a 2013 Canadian-Irish drama

Music
 STAY, the fandom name for the K-pop group Stray Kids

Albums
 Stay (The Controllers album), and the title song, 1986
 Stay (Jeremy Camp album), and the title song (see below), 2002
 Stay (Luca Brasi album), and the title song, 2018
 Stay (Oingo Boingo album), and the title song (see below), 1990
 Stay (Simply Red album), and the title song, 2007
 Stay, 1987 album by Lory Bianco (recording as Bonnie Bianco), and the title song
Stay, 1981 album by Ray, Goodman & Brown
 Stay: Yoake no Soul, a 2009 album by Garnet Crow

Songs
 "Stay" (2-4 Family song), 1998
 "Stay" (Anna Odobescu song), representing Moldova at Eurovision 2019
 "Stay" (Bernard Butler song), 1998
 "Stay" (Black Stone Cherry song), 2011
 "Stay" (Blackpink song), 2016
 "Stay" (David Bowie song), 1976
 "Stay" (David Guetta song), 2004
 "Stay" (Destine song), 2011
 "Stay" (Elisa song), 2007
 "Stay" (Eternal song), 1993
 "Stay" (Fayray song), 2002
 "Stay" (Hebe Tien song), 2018
 "Stay" (Hurts song), 2010
 "Stay" (Jay Sean song), 2008
 "Stay" (Jeremy Camp song), 2002
 "Stay" (Jodeci song), 1991
 "Stay" (The Kid Laroi and Justin Bieber song), 2021
 "Stay" (Kygo song), 2015
 "Stay" (Maurice Williams song), 1960;, covered by the Four Seasons, Jackson Browne, Cyndi Lauper, the Dave Clark Five, Andrew Gold, the Hollies, Jan and Dean, Bruce Springsteen, and others
 "Stay" (Monika Linkytė song), representing Lithuania at Eurovision 2023
 "Stay" (Ne-Yo song), 2006
 "Stay" (Nick Jonas & the Administration song), 2010
 "Stay" (No Devotion song), 2014
 "Stay" (Post Malone song), 2018
 "Stay" (Rihanna song), 2013; covered by Adam Lambert, Jonas Brothers, Fatin Shidqia Lubis, Demi Lovato, Patti Smith, and others
 "Stay" (SafetySuit song), 2009
 "Stay" (Sash! song), 1997
 "Stay" (Shakespears Sister song), 1992
 "Stay" (Stephen Gately song), 2001
 "Stay" (Sigma song), 2015
 "Stay" (Sugarland song), 2007
 "Stay" (Tooji song), 2012
 "Stay" (Zedd and Alessia Cara song), 2017
 "Stay?", by the Rogue Traders, 2003
 "Stay (Faraway, So Close!)", by U2, 1993
 "Stay (I Missed You)", by Lisa Loeb, 1994
 "Stay (Wasting Time)", by Dave Matthews Band, 1998
 "Stay (While the Night Is Still Young)", by Ol' 55, 1997
 "Stay: Now I'm Here", by Dream, 2001
 "Stay", by Agnetha Faltskog from Wrap Your Arms Around Me
 "Stay", by Alison Krauss from Forget About It
 "Stay", by Alkaline Trio from Is This Thing Cursed?
 "Stay", by Barry Manilow from Barry Live in Britain
 "Stay", by Bellefire from Spin the Wheel
 "Stay", by Belly from Star
 "Stay", by Beulah
 "Stay", by the Blue Nile from A Walk Across the Rooftops
 "Stay", by BTS from Be
 "Stay", by Cher Lloyd from Sticks + Stones album
 "Stay", by Coldrain from Fateless
 "Stay", by Cradle of Filth from Thornography
 "Stay", by the Crash from Pony Ride
 "Stay", by Cueshé from Half Empty Half Full
 "Stay", by Daryl Ong, the opening theme from the television series On the Wings of Love
 "Stay", by Dave Gahan from Paper Monsters
 "Stay", by Delta Goodrem, B-side of "Love... Thy Will Be Done"
 "Stay", by Destiny's Child from The Writing's on the Wall
 "Stay", by Down to Earth Approach from the compilation A Santa Cause: It's a Punk Rock Christmas
 "Stay", by EXO from Universe
 "Stay", by Florida Georgia Line from Here's to the Good Times
 "Stay", by Gavin DeGraw from Free
 "Stay", by Giant from Time to Burn
 "Stay", by Goldfinger from Goldfinger
 "Stay", by Gregori Lukas
 "Stay", by Hans Zimmer from the Interstellar film soundtrack
 "Stay", by Hillsong Music Australia from By Your Side
 "Stay", by Jimmy Needham from Clear the Stage
 "Stay", by Jimmy Somerville from Home Again
 "Stay", by Joy Williams from Genesis
 "Stay", by Little Big Town from Little Big Town
 "Stay", by Madonna from Like a Virgin
 "Stay", by Marcella Detroit from The Vehicle
 "Stay", by Mayday Parade from Mayday Parade
 "Stay", by Miley Cyrus from Can't Be Tamed
 "Stay", by No Devotion from Permanence
 "Stay", by Oingo Boingo from Dead Man's Party
 "Stay", by Pink Floyd from Obscured by Clouds
 "Stay", by Poets of the Fall from Signs of Life
 "Stay", by Prism from Small Change
 "Stay", by Robbie Seay Band from Give Yourself Away
 "Stay", by Ronan Keating from Winter Songs
 "Stay", by Rufus featuring Chaka Khan from Street Player
 "Stay", by Sara Bareilles from Once Upon Another Time
 "Stay", by Saves the Day from Under the Boards
 "Stay", by Simply Red from Stay
 "Stay", by Steve Angello from Wild Youth
 "Stay", by Steve Grand from All-American Boy
 "Stay", by the Tragically Hip from Music @ Work
 "Stay", by Toni Braxton from Pulse
 "Stay", by Two Steps from Hell from Miracles
 "Stay", by Tyrese
 "Stay", by Victoria Justice
 "Stay", by Vixen from Tangerine
 "Stay", by the Waifs from Sun Dirt Water
 "Stay", by Wendy and Lisa from Wendy and Lisa
 "Stay", by Why Don't We from The Good Times and the Bad Ones
 "Stay", by Will Oldham (recorded as Bonnie 'Prince' Billy)
 "Stay", composed by Ernest Gold and Norman Gimbel for the 1969 film The Secret of Santa Vittoria
 "Stay (The Black Rose and the Universal Wheel)", by OMD from The Pacific Age
 "Stay (Ven a Mi)", by Il Divo from Wicked Game

Other uses in arts, entertainment, and media
 "Stay" (Haven), an episode of Haven
 Stay (novel), a 2002 crime novel by Nicola Griffith
 Stay (sculptures), two artworks in Christchurch, New Zealand

See also
 Demi Lovato: Stay Strong, a 2012 documentary film about Demi Lovato
 Let's Stay Together (disambiguation)
 "Let's Stay Together Tonight", a song by Air Supply, from the album The Book of Love
 Stay Awake (disambiguation)
 "Stay Stay Stay", a song by Taylor Swift, from the album Red
 Stay the Night (disambiguation)
 Stay with Me (disambiguation)
 Stay with The Hollies, a 1964 album by The Hollies